Discount was an American punk rock band based in Gainesville, Florida. The band originally formed in Vero Beach, Florida in 1995, but relocated to Gainesville in 1999. They performed their last show on August 19, 2000 at Market Street Pub in Gainesville, Florida. Members have gone on to form The Dead Weather, The Kills, The Kitchen, Black Cougar Shock Unit, Unitas, The Routineers, The Draft, Laserhead, Stolen Parts, Monikers, and Blab School.

During its span, Discount released three full-length albums, several EPs, and two b-side collections. The band toured with As Friends Rust and Dillinger Four across the United States for five weeks from  June 11 to July 18, 1998. In promotion of their split CD/7" with As Friends Rust, Discount embarked on a six-week European tour, from December 3, 1998 to January 14, 1999, accompanied by Swedish hardcore group Purusam. The European tour included a stop to play at the Good Life Recordings Winter Festival, in Kortrijk, Belgium.

Discography

Albums
Ataxia's Alright Tonight (1996), Liquid Meat/Far Out Records
Half Fiction (1997), Kat Records
Crash Diagnostic (2000), New American Dream

EPs/7 inches/splits
Three Piece Suit (1995), 3-way split with Combination Grey and Pohgoh
Mom Lied to Me (1995), Parking Lot Records/self-released
Discount/My Pal Trigger split 7-inch (1996), Tripucka Records
Discount/Flatspots/Wolfdaddys/Stizzle split 7-inch (1996), Boxcar Records (featuring the band's cover of The Golden Girls theme)
All Too Often 7-inch (1996), Mighty Idy Records
Wonder Pulled Me Under 7-inch (1996), Liquid Meat Records
Discount/Shotwell Coho split 7-inch (1997), What Else? Records
Discount/Cigarretteman split 7-inch (1997), Snuffy Smile/Suburban Home Records
Discount/J Church split 7-inch (1997), Liquid Meat Records
Her Last Day 7-inch (1997), Helter Skelter/Panic Records
Discount/Crettins Puddle split CD EP (1998), Shock Records
Discount/My Winter Jane split 7-inch (1998), Snuffy Smile
Love, Billy (1998), Fueled by Ramen
As Friends Rust / Discount (split with As Friends Rust) (1998), Good Life Recordings
Discount/Beauty School Dropout split 7-inch (1999), Speedowax
Open Ended Aerial 7-inch (1999), Rugger Bugger
Read Army Faction 7-inch (2000), 4-way split with Avail, The Weakerthans and Hot Water Music, No Idea Records (all four songs were taken from the Better Read Than Dead compilation on AK Press)
Discount/J Church split LP (2000), Rugger Bugger (featuring five ELO covers from J Church and the five Billy Bragg covers by Discount from the Love, Billy CD EP)
Appeared on 403 Chaos Comp: Florida Fucking Hardcore (1998)
Appeared on Songs That Will Make You Cool, a compilation released by Rockstar Recordings in 1995

B-side compilations
Singles No. 1 (2002), New American Dream
Singles No. 2 (2002), New American Dream

Members 
Final lineup
 Alison Mosshart – lead vocals (1995–2000
 Ryan Seagrist – guitar (1995–2000)
 Todd Rockhill – bass guitar (1999–2000)
 Bill Nesper – drums (1995–2000)

Former members
 Eric Ervin – vocals (1995)
 James Parker – bass guitar (1995–1999)
 Justin Focco – drums (1995)

References

External links 
 Official Website archived by the Wayback Machine
 
 

1995 establishments in Florida
2000 disestablishments in Florida
Asian Man Records artists
Fearless Records artists
Fueled by Ramen artists
G7 Welcoming Committee Records artists
Good Life Recordings artists
Musical groups established in 1995
Musical groups disestablished in 2000
Musical groups from Gainesville, Florida
Punk rock groups from Florida